Villianur, or Villianour, is a town in the Union Territory of Puducherry, India. It is a commune panchayat and the headquarters of the Villianur taluk of Puducherry District. Kameeswarar temple is the major landmark in the town.

Location 

Villianur is located at a distance of 9 kilometres south of Puducherry Municipality. It forms a part of the Puducherry urban agglomeration. The town houses famous hindu temple Kokilambigai udunurai sri thirukameswarar Kameeswarar temple. Located in the banks of Sankaraparani River. surrounded by more industries. It has several years old Villianur railway station,formed during french rule.

Demographics 

According to the 2001 census, Villianur had a population of 104,000. It is the third largest town in Puducherry District after Puducherry and Ozhukarai.

See also 
 Our Lady of Lourdes Shrine, Villianur
 Villianur railway station
 Kameeswarar temple
 Sankaraparani River

References 
 "Archeologists should have a say in Villianur temple" 
 

Cities and towns in Puducherry district